Tauxigny-Saint-Bauld is a commune in the department of Indre-et-Loire, central France. The municipality was established on 1 January 2018 by merger of the former communes of Tauxigny (the seat) and Saint-Bauld.

See also 
Communes of the Indre-et-Loire department

References 

Communes of Indre-et-Loire